The 1949 Texas Tech Red Raiders football team represented Texas Technological College—now known as Texas Tech University—as a member of the Border Conference during the 1949 college football season. Led by ninth-year head coach Dell Morgan, the Red Raiders compiled an overall record of 7–5 with a mark of 5–0 in conference play, winning the Border Conference title for the third consecutive year. Texas Tech was invited to the Raisin Bowl, where they lost to San Jose State.

Schedule

References

Texas Tech
Texas Tech Red Raiders football seasons
Border Conference football champion seasons
Texas Tech Red Raiders football